Michael Glos (born 14 December 1944) is a German politician of the Christian Social Union (CSU) who served as Minister for Economics and Technology in the government of Chancellor Angela Merkel from 22 November 2005 until 10 February 2009.

Early life and career
After the secondary school level, Glos made an apprenticeship as miller and became master in 1967. Starting 1968, he managed his parents' flour mill in Prichsenstadt.

Political career

Career in local politics
Glos joined the CSU in 1970. In 1972, he was the first chairman of the CSU-chapter of his hometown Prichsenstadt. From 1975 to 1993, he was chairman of the CSU chapter of Kitzingen. From 1976 he was part of the executive board of the CSU in Lower Franconia. From then he was also part of the CSU leadership. From 1972 to 1978, Glos was member of the district council of Prichsenstadt and, from 1975 to 1993, member of the council of the district (Kreistag) of Kitzingen.

Career in national politics
Glos first became a member of the Bundestag in the 1976 elections, representing the Schweinfurt district. From 1993 to 2005 he was chairman of the CSU parliamentary group and deputy chairman of the CDU/CSU parliamentary group.

Following the 2005 elections, Glos was appointed as Federal Minister for Economic Affairs and Technology at short notice when CSU leader Edmund Stoiber rejected it. Merkel had reportedly wanted to appoint him as Federal Minister of Defence. 

During his time in government, Glos was widely considered one of the weakest members of Chancellor Merkel's cabinet and had often seemed to struggle with his portfolio. Among other projects, he led efforts on a 2008 law that allows the government to block moves by foreign investors to take large stakes in German companies, if it concludes that they endanger the country's interests.

On 7 February 2009, Glos offered his resignation as minister, which was first denied by Horst Seehofer, but later accepted. He justified his resignation with his age and the need for renewal in the CSU after Seehofer's election as CSU chairman.

Other activities
 KfW, Ex-Officio Member of the Board of Supervisory Directors (2006–2009)

Personal life
Glos is married and father of two children. His third child died in a car accident near Munich in 1997.

References

External links

  Homepage of Michael Glos
  Biography by German Bundestag

1944 births
Living people
Commanders Crosses of the Order of Merit of the Federal Republic of Germany
Economy ministers of Germany
Federal government ministers of Germany
Members of the Bundestag for Bavaria
People from Kitzingen (district)
Members of the Bundestag 2009–2013
Members of the Bundestag 2005–2009
Members of the Bundestag 2002–2005
Members of the Bundestag 1998–2002
Members of the Bundestag 1994–1998
Members of the Bundestag 1990–1994
Members of the Bundestag 1987–1990
Members of the Bundestag 1983–1987
Members of the Bundestag 1980–1983
Members of the Bundestag 1976–1980
Members of the Bundestag for the Christian Social Union in Bavaria